Canada competed in the 2015 Pan American Games in Toronto from July 10 to 26, 2015. As the host nation, the team competed in all 36 sports.

On July 1, 2015, canoer Mark Oldershaw was named the flagbearer of the country at the opening ceremony. A team of 723 athletes competing in all 36 sports represented the country at the games, the largest team Canada sent to any multisport event ever.

Competitors
The following table lists Canada's delegation per sport and gender.

Medallists

Archery

Canada will enter a maximum team of three men and three women, for a total of six athletes. The team was officially named on June 16, 2015.

Men

Women

Athletics

Canada's final team was announced on June 21, 2015. The team consists of 90 athletes (46 men and 44 women).

Key
Note–Ranks given for track events are for the entire round
Q =Qualified for the next round
q =Qualified for the next round as a fastest loser or, in field events, by position without achieving the qualifying target
NR =National record
GR =Games record
DB =Decathlon Best
PB =Personal best
DNF =Did not finish
NM =No mark
N/A =Round not applicable for the event
Bye =Athlete not required to compete in round

Men

Field events

Combined events – Decathlon

Women

Field events

Combined events – Heptathlon

Badminton

Canada as host nation was allowed to enter a full team of eight athletes (four men and four women). However Badminton Canada mistakenly entered athletes Adrian Liu and Derrick Ng in overlapping events, which is a World Badminton Federation rule violation. Badminton Canada launched an appeal, however it was ultimately unsuccessful. Therefore, both athletes had to be withdrawn from the event.

Men

Women

Mixed

Baseball

Canada as host nation will automatically enter a men's and women's teams. The men's team will consist of 24 athletes, while the women's team will consist of 18.

Men's tournament

Group A

Semifinal

Gold medal game

Women's tournament

Group A

Bronze medal match

Gold medal match

Basketball

Canada as host nation will automatically enter a men's and women's teams. Each team will consist of 12 athletes, for a total of 24.

Men's tournament

Group B

Semifinal

Gold medal game

Women' tournament

Group B

Semifinal

Gold medal game

Beach volleyball

Canada qualified a men's and's women's pairs, by virtue of being the host nation. The team was officially named on June 18, 2015.

Boxing 

Canada as host nation was allowed to enter five men and one woman automatically. Canada later qualified two more men and two women at the qualification tournament held in June 2015. Canada's team thus consists of seven men and three women, for a total of ten boxers.

Men

Women

Bowling

Canada as host nation is permitted to enter a full team of four athletes (two men and two women). The team was named on April 7, 2015. During the men's doubles event Lavoie scored a perfect game in the fifth round, the first in Pan American Games history.

Singles

Doubles

Canoeing

Slalom
Canada as host nation will be allowed to enter boats in each event. A total of four athletes were named to the team on May 25, 2015

Sprint
Canada qualified 15 athletes in the sprint discipline (6 in men's kayak and 4 in women's kayak, 4 in men's canoe and 1 in women's canoe). The team was officially named on June 8, 2015.

Men

Women

Qualification Legend: QF =Qualify to final; QS =Qualify to semifinal

Cycling

Canada qualified a full team of 24 athletes (two men and two women in each of mountain biking and BMX, and ten men and six women in road/track cycling). The team was officially named on June 1, 2015.

BMX

Mountain biking

Road
Men

Women

Track
Keirin

Sprint

Omnium

Team pursuit and sprint

Diving

Canada qualified a full team of eight athletes (four men and four women). The team was announced on June 2, 2015.

Men

Women

Equestrian

Canada as host nation is permitted to enter a full team of twelve athletes (four per discipline). The team was officially named on June 13, 2015.

Dressage
Canada qualified a full dressage team.

Eventing
Canada qualified a full eventing team.

Jumping
Canada qualified a full jumping team.
Individual

Team

Fencing

Canada as host nation is permitted to enter a full team of 18 fencers (9 men and 9 women). The team was officially named on June 11, 2015.

Individual
Men

Women

Team

Field hockey

As host nation Canada an automatic berth in both the men's and women's tournaments, for a total of 32 athletes (16 men and 16 women).

Men's tournament

Pool B

Quarterfinal

Semifinal

Gold medal match

Women's tournament

Pool A

Quarterfinal

Semifinal

Bronze medal match

Football (soccer)

Canada as host nation will enter both a men's and women's teams, for a total of 36 athletes (18 men and 18 women).

Men's tournament

Group A

Women's tournament

Group B

Semifinal

Bronze Medal Match

Golf

As hosts Canada qualified a full team of four athletes (two men and two women). The team was named on May 31, 2015. Brooke Henderson, one of Canada's women entries, withdrew several weeks prior to the Games and was not replaced.

Gymnastics

Canada qualified a full team of twenty-two gymnasts (10 in artistic, eight in rhythmic and four in trampoline). The artistic and rhythmic teams were announced on June 4, 2015.

Artistic
Canada qualified 10 athletes (five per gender).

Men
Team & Individual Qualification

Qualification Legend: Q =Qualified to apparatus final

Individual Finals

Women
Team & Individual Qualification

Qualification Legend: Q =Qualified to apparatus final

Individual Finals

Rhythmic
Canada qualified a full team of eight gymnasts (six in group and two in individual).

Individual

Qualification Legend: Q =Qualified to apparatus final

Group

Trampoline
Canada as host nation is permitted to enter a full team of four athletes (two men and two women). The team was named on April 9, 2015.

Handball

Canada as host nation will automatically enter a men's and women's teams. Each team will consist of 15 athletes, for a total of 30.

Men's tournament

Group A

Women's tournament

Group A

Judo

Canada as host nation is permitted to enter a full team of fourteen judokas (seven men and seven women). The team however contains 13 athletes, the women's over 78 kg event will not be represented. The team was officially announced on June 8, 2015.

Men

Women

Karate

Canada as host nation, is allowed to enter a full team of ten athletes (five men and five women). The team was announced on June 3, 2015.

Men

Women

Modern pentathlon

Canada qualified a team of 5 athletes (2 men and 3 women). The team was named on May 21, 2015.

Racquetball

Canada as host nation will enter a full team of four men and four women for a total of eight athletes. The team was announced on June 17, 2015.

Men

Women

Roller sports

Canada's roller sports team will consist of five athletes (one in figure, and the maximum of two male and two female in speed). The team was officially announced on June 7, 2015. Canada will not compete in the men's singles figure skating event after no athlete registered to compete in the trials.

Figure

Speed

Rowing

Canada as host nation will be allowed to enter all fourteen events, with a maximum of 26 athletes (18 men and 8 women). The team was announced on June 2, 2015.

Men

Women

Qualification Legend: FA=Final A (medal); FB=Final B (non-medal); R=Repechage

Rugby sevens

Canada as host nation, has automatically qualified a men's and women's teams for a total of 24 athletes (12 men and 12 women).

Men's tournament

Group B

Quarterfinal

Semifinal

Gold Medal Match

Women's tournament

Gold Medal Game

Sailing

Canada as host nation will enter a full team of 10 boats and 18 athletes. The team was announced on May 22, 2015.

Men

Women 

Open

Shooting

Canada qualified a maximum team of 25 athletes, however only 24 athletes were selected to the final team (15 men and 9 women).

Key: FPR – Final Pan American Games Record

Men

Women

Softball

As host nation Canada is allowed to enter both men's and women's teams. Each team will consist of 15 athletes for a total of 30.

Men's tournament

Group A

Women's tournament

Group A

Semifinals

Bronze Medal Game

Gold Medal Game

Squash

Canada as host nation was allowed to enter the maximum team of three men and three women.

Singles and Doubles 

Team

Swimming

Canada's swim team will consist of a maximum of 36 swimmers in the pool (18 per gender), and an additional four swimmers (two per gender) in the open water events. The swimming team was named on April 4, 2015. The open water team was announced on May 5, 2015.

Men

Women

Synchronized swimming

As hosts Canada qualified a full team of nine athletes. The team was named on May 28, 2015.

Table tennis

Canada qualified a men's and women's team for a total of six athletes (three men and three women). The team was officially announced on June 9, 2015.

Men

Women

Taekwondo

Canada as host nation will be allowed to enter a full team of four men and four women, for a total of eight athletes. The team was named on May 22, 2015.

Men

Women

Tennis

Canada as host nation can enter a maximum team of six athletes (three men and three women). The team was announced on June 9, 2015. Later Sharon Fichman withdrew from the team, after her injury did not recover in time, she was replaced by Carol Zhao.

Singles

Doubles

Triathlon

Canada as host nation will be allowed to enter a full team of three men and three women, for a total of six athletes. The team was officially named on June 14, 2015.

Volleyball

Canada as host nation will automatically enter a men's and women's teams. Each team will consist of 12 athletes, for a total of 24.

Men's tournament

Team

Standings

Results

|}

Semifinals

|}

Bronze medal match

|}

Women's tournament

Team

Standings

Results

|}

Seventh place match

|}

Water polo

Canada as host nation automatically qualified to enter a men's and women's team. Each team consisted of 13 athletes, for a total of 26.

Men's tournament

Group B

Semifinal

Bronze Medal Match

Women's tournament

Group B

Semifinal

Gold Medal Match

Water skiing

Canada as host nation automatically qualifies a full team of five athletes (four in water skiing, one in wakeboard). The team was announced on June 3, 2015.

Waterski and Wakeboard

Overall

Weightlifting

Canada as the host nation was permitted to enter a full team of 13 athletes (7 men and 6 women).

Men

Women

Wrestling

Canada qualified full female team of six athletes and a full men's freestyle team of six athletes, as well as four male Greco-Roman wrestlers. The team was officially announced on May 19, 2015. John Pineda was scheduled to be among the participants, but he did not make weight and had to withdraw from the 57 kg freestyle event.

Men's freestyle

Greco-Roman

Women's Freestyle

See also
Canada at the 2015 Parapan American Games
Canada at the 2016 Summer Olympics

References

Nations at the 2015 Pan American Games
2015
2015 in Canadian sports